Elachista bigorrensis is a moth of the family Elachistidae that is endemic to France.

References

bigorrensis
Moths described in 1990
Moths of Europe
Endemic insects of Metropolitan France